Edgar Blatchford (born November 24, 1950) is an American politician, academic, and attorney, and perennial candidate who served as the Mayor of Seward, Alaska. Blatchford sought the 2016 Democratic Party nomination for United States Senate, losing the nomination in the Alaskan primary to Ray Metcalfe. Blatchford filed to run for lieutenant governor in the 2018 Democratic primary, and dropped out of the race on June 8.

Blatchford has been a professor at the University of Alaska Anchorage since 1995, teaching in the Department of Journalism and Public Communications. Blatchford also served as Commissioner of the Department of Community and Regional Affairs (1990–1994) under Wally Hickel and Commissioner of Community and Economic Development (2003–2005) under Frank Murkowski.

Early life and education 
Blatchford was born in Nome, Alaska Territory in 1950 and relocated to Seward, Alaska in 1960. Blatchford graduated from Seward High School and earned a Bachelor of Arts degree from Alaska Pacific University, Juris Doctor from the University of Washington School of Law, Masters of Arts degree in journalism from Columbia University, Master of Public Administration from Harvard University, and PhD from the University of Alaska Fairbanks.

Career 
Blatchford founded the publishing company Alaska Newspapers, Inc. in 1983. In 1990, Blatchford partnered with Calista Native Corporation to procure a total of six rural Alaskan newspapers. ANI was chartered to serve sparsely populated regions in Alaska to include parts of the Kenai Peninsula, Bristol Bay, Prince William Sound, the Aleutian Islands and the Yukon-Kuskowim Delta. In 2011, Blatchford purchased The Tundra Drums and Seward Phoenix Log from Calista Corp.; subsequently, Calista liquidated its share in the remaining newspapers in August 2011.

Blatchford worked as a member of Wally Hickel's cabinet in developing the Community Development Quotas program aimed at providing educational and vocational opportunities to rural Alaskans in Bristol Bay and other western Alaskan communities.

Blatchford was appointed commissioner of Community and Economic Development in January 2003 by governor Frank Murkowski. Murkowski cited Blatchford's prior experience as commissioner of Community and Regional Affairs under governor Hickel as a prime reason for Blatchford's selection. On July 22, 2005, Blatchford resigned his position as commissioner of Community and Economic Development due to conflict of interest allegations between his official state duties and ties with Chugach Alaska Corp.

Political positions 
Until the 2016 Alaskan Senate race, Blatchford had been affiliated with the Republican Party, switching parties due to ideological reasons. He strongly supports reform of the 1971 Alaska Native Claims Settlement Act (ANCSA), saying that it was an experiment that did not accomplish what it was charted to do.

Gun control 
Blatchford is an advocate of background checks for gun ownership and states that his stance is in line with the intent of the Second Amendment.

Illegal immigration 
Blatchford supports a path for citizenship or other legal status for those illegal immigrants without criminal records.

Alaskan economy 
Blatchford believes smaller Alaskan communities would benefit from a more diverse economic base.

Climate change 
Blatchford believes global warming is a scientific certainty that must be addressed. He wants Alaska to increase its prominence in studying climate change and the Arctic.

Bibliography
 Blatchford, Edgar. "Working Together for Community Economic Development in Rural Alaska." Economic Development Review 12 (1994): 41–45. Print. ISSN 0742-3713.
 Blatchford, Edgar. "Creating Jobs and Industry in Rural Alaska." Alaska Economic Trends 14.1 (1994): 6–12. ISSN 0160-3345.

References

External links 

1952 births
Alaska Democrats
Alaska Pacific University alumni
American newspaper publishers (people)
Businesspeople from Alaska
Candidates in the 2020 United States Senate elections
Candidates in the 2022 United States Senate elections
Candidates in the 2022 United States elections
Columbia University Graduate School of Journalism alumni
Harvard Kennedy School alumni
Living people
Mayors of places in Alaska
State cabinet secretaries of Alaska
University of Alaska Fairbanks alumni
University of Washington School of Law alumni